Alice Gold (born Alice McLaughlin) is an English singer-songwriter based in London, formerly signed to Sunday Best and currently signed to Fiction Records.

Gold lives on her 53-foot narrowboat with her husband, film producer Jules Cocke, in north London's canal boat community, where she recorded many demos.

"Like many an adventurer with wanderlust, Alice spent some of her early twenties traveling South East Asia with her trusty battered guitar, continually gathering inspiration and song ideas, before finding herself in Edinburgh. There she underwent a period of experimentation, collaborating with various lights on the music scene. She moved to London to pursue her ambitions, but the death of her mother precipitated an intense period of loss and grief, culminating in a need to escape the grind of city life. Alice took a trip to America, ambling around the Deep South, en route to San Francisco, with little more than her wits and that battered old guitar again, in a 1979 Dodge Winnebago. On the way she found courage, independence and freedom, all key in developing her own unique style and sound."

Her debut single "Dolly Figured" was released under her original name on 21 October 2007.

Her debut single as Alice Gold, "Orbiter", was released on 23 September 2010 through Pure Groove Records, with a single launch party at The Drop in Stoke Newington. The Guardian said it "showcases Gold's mighty voice through its power-pop chorus" and described her as "One to watch".

This was followed by "Runaway Love", released on Fiction Records, which has received airplay on radio stations across the UK, entering the A-List on BBC Radio 2. On the official release date, 18 April 2011, an acoustic EP was recorded live at Toerag Studios where The White Stripes have previously recorded.

Gold's debut album Seven Rainbows, released on 4 July 2011, was produced by Dan Carey (Franz Ferdinand, Hot Chip, Lily Allen). In an interview with PopCultureMonster.com she said of the album, "the main bass, drums and guitars rhythm tracks were all recorded live and on tape like the old '60s records. The over-dubs are mostly made up of one-takes, whether it be guitar or vocal takes. My producer Dan Carey and I decided that if a take felt good then we’d keep it, so it is complete with minor ‘mistakes’ and quirky sounds through doing that, which we both like. It's a very honest album, quite autobiographical. The songs were born from a lot of darkness and grief but the lyrics are drenched in hope because of that, which is why I imagine people connect to it."

In October 2010, Gold was shortlisted for Q magazine's 'Next Big Thing' award.

In September 2011, Gold's cover of the Billy Fury song "Wondrous Place" was used in an advert for the British beer brand Carling.

She has toured with Eels, Athlete, Band Of Skulls, Noah and the Whale, and The Twilight Singers, and has upcoming tour support slots confirmed with The Dears and The Bookhouse Boys.

Gold also played festivals in 2011, including Glastonbury, V Festival, T in the Park, Harvest at Jimmy's Festival, Jodrell Bank Live, Kendal Calling, Cornbury Festival and Hull's Freedom Festival.

Discography

Albums 
 2011 – Seven Rainbows

Singles 
 2010 – "Orbiter" / "Kill the Lights"
 2011 – "Wondrous Place"
 2011 – "Runaway Love"
 2011 – "Cry Cry Cry"
 2011 – "End of the World" / "You'll Be Mine"

Featured artist 
 2012 – "Out the Blue" (Sub Focus feat. Alice Gold)

References

External links 
 Official blog
 Official website

Year of birth missing (living people)
Living people
English women singer-songwriters
Fiction Records artists